Blyxa aubertii, common name bamboo plant, is a plant species widespread across Asia, Europe, Africa and Australia, but known from the Western Hemisphere only from a few collections in the southwestern part of the US State of Louisiana. This is an aquatic plant growing in shallow lakes and ponds.

Description

In the aquarium
This and other species in the genus are sold commercially as greenery to grow alongside fish in aquaria. They require moderate or bright light. Blyxa aubertii has been in the aquarium trade for a long time but has never been very popular.

References

Hydrocharitaceae
Flora of Louisiana
Flora of Africa
Flora of Europe
Flora of Asia
Flora of Australia